The following colleges are affiliated to Kashmir University, Kashmir for all academic purposes. Engineering colleges in the list are also approved by AICTE.

District Anantnag

Govt. Degree College, Dooru
Govt. Degree College, Bijbehara
Govt. Womens College Anantnag
Govt. Boys College, Anantnag
Govt. Degree College, Kokernag
Govt. Degree College, Uttersoo, Anantnag
Govt Degree College, Vailoo, Larnoo Anantnag

District Bandipora

Hassan Shah Khoi-e-Hami Memorial 
Govt. Degree College, Bandipora
Govt. Degree College, Gurez
Govt Degree College, Sumbal

District Baramulla

Govt. Degree College Women, Baramulla
Govt. Degree College Women, Sopore
Govt. Degree College, Uri
Govt. Degree College, Pattan
Govt. Degree College, Sopore
Govt. Degree College Boys, Baramulla
Govt Degree College, HadiPora,Rafiabad
Govt Degree College, Tangmarg, Baramulla
Govt Degree College, Magam, Tangmarg
Govt Degree College ,Bomai, Sopore

District Budgam

Govt. Degree College, Budgam
Govt. Degree College, Beerwah
Govt. Degree College, Khansahib, Budgam
Govt. Degree College, Magam 
Govt. Degree College, Chariesharief, Budgam
Govt. Degree College, Soibug, Budgam
Govt. Degree College, Chadora, Budgam

District Gaderbal

Govt. Degree College, Ganderbal
Govt Degree College, Kangan, Ganderbal

District Kulgam
Govt. Degree College, Kulgam
Govt. Degree College, Kelam, Kulgam
Govt Degree College, Dhamal Hanjipora, Kulgam

District Kupwara

Govt. Degree College of Handwara
Govt. Degree College, Kupwara
Govt. Degree College, Tangdhar
Govt. Degree College, Sogam, 
Kupwara
Govt Degree College Women, Kupwara

District Pulwama

Govt. Degree College, Pulwama
Govt. Degree College, Tral
Govt. Degree College, Women, Pulwama
Govt Degree College, Pampore, Pulwama

District Srinagar  
 Vishwa Bharti Womens College, Rainawari Srinagar
 Gandhi Memorial College, Srinagar
 Government College for Women, Nawakadal Srinagar
Govt Degree College, Bagi Dilawar Khan, Srinagar

District Shopian
 Govt. Degree College, Shopian

District Kargil, Ladakh
Govt. Degree College, Kargil

District Leh, Ladakh
Govt. Degree College, Leh

See also
List of colleges affiliated to Jammu University, Jammu
List of colleges in Srinagar
List of colleges in Anantnag
List of engineering colleges in Jammu and Kashmir
SSM College of Engineering
NIT Srinagar

References

 
Kashmir University